Machilipatnam test Range Project is a missile test range facility planned by DRDO of India.

As of 2012 the project is proposed to be set up at Gollalamoda village in Nagayalanka mandal of Krishna district near Coastal town Machilipatnam.
The project needs to be spread over 260 acres of land with an investment of Rs 1000 Crores.

The facility is projected to be a full-fledged testing range to support both short-range and long-range missile missions.
It will have a launch control centre, a few launch pads, a blockhouse and state-of-the-art communication network, beside permanent monitoring stations such 
as telemetry and electro-optical tracking. The project is expected to be completed in three years from the time of allotment of land to DRDO.

See also
 Pashan Test Range
 Ramgarh Test Range
 Chitradurga Aeronautical Test Range
 Tandur Test Range

External links
 http://www.thehindu.com/news/national/andhra-pradesh/land-survey-completed-in-krishna-delta-for-missile-launch-facility/article4585571.ece

References

Ministry of Defence (India)
Defence Research and Development Organisation
Military installations of India